Operation Dew refers to two separate field trials conducted by the United States in the 1950s. The tests were designed to study the behavior of aerosol-released biological agents.

General description
Operation Dew took place from 1951 to 1952 off the southeast coast of the United States, including near Georgia, and North and South Carolina. Operation Dew consisted of two sets of trials, Dew I and Dew II. The tests involved the release of 250 pounds (110 kg) of fluorescent particles from a minesweeper off the coast. Operation Dew I was described in a U.S. Army report known as "Dugway Special Report 162", dated August 1, 1952. The purpose of Operation Dew was to study the behavior of aerosol-released biological agents.

Dew I
Operation Dew I consisted of five separate trials from March 26, 1952 until April 21, 1952 that were designed to test the feasibility of maintaining a large aerosol cloud released offshore until it drifted over land, achieving a large area coverage. Two of the trials dispersed clouds of zinc cadmium sulfide over large areas of all three U.S. states. The tests affected over 60,000 square miles (150,000 km²) of populated coastal region in the U.S. southeast.

Dew II
Dew II involved the release of fluorescent particles (zinc cadmium sulfide) and plant spores (Lycopodium) from an aircraft. Dew II was described in a 1953 Army report which remained classified at the time of a 1997 report by the U.S. National Research Council concerning the U.S. Army's zinc cadmium sulfide dispersion program of the 1950s.

See also
 Human experimentation in the United States
Operation LAC
Project 112

Notes

References
U.S. National Research Council, Subcommittee on Zinc Cadmium Sulfide. Toxicologic Assessment of the Army's Zinc Cadmium Sulfide Dispersion, (Google Books), National Academies Press, 1997,().

Dew
Dew
Dew
1950s in the United States